Winnitoba railway station is located in Winnitoba, Manitoba. This station is currently in use by Via Rail. Transcontinental Canadian trains stop here. This station is listed as a "sign post." The station building was destroyed by a forest fire in May 2016, but trains can still stop here.

References

External links
 Winnitoba railway station

Via Rail stations in Manitoba
Whiteshell Provincial Park